Pile moje is the fourth studio album by Yugoslav pop-folk singer Lepa Brena and her band Slatki Greh. It was released 17 November 1984 through the record label PGP-RTB.

The album name translated, literally means "My Chick" (as in baby chicken). Chick is a term of endearment in Serbo-Croatian, synonymous with dear.

This was her fifth of twelve albums with Slatki Greh.

Background 
The main producer of the album this time was Milija Đokić. The album was promoted in the New Year's national television program in which viewers had the opportunity to see Lepa Brena in Hollywood releases. After this album, Lepa Brena received the Oscar of Popularity and was named the singer of the year.
The album was sold in 500,000 copies.

Track listing

Personnel

Production and recording
Dragan Vukićević – recording

Crew
Ćulum – design
Ivan Mojašević – photography

Release history

References

1984 albums
Lepa Brena albums
PGP-RTB albums
Serbo-Croatian language albums